Bachman–Turner Overdrive II is the second album by Canadian rock band Bachman–Turner Overdrive, released in 1973. The album reached #4 in the US and #6 in Canada.

Bachman–Turner Overdrive II includes BTO's first Top 40 single, "Let It Ride", which peaked at #23 on the US Billboard Hot 100. The album's second and bigger hit single is "Takin' Care of Business". Though it never cracked the Top 10 on the US singles charts (reaching #12 in 1974), it became one of the band's most enduring anthems and stayed on the Billboard chart for 20 weeks. Both singles reached #3 on the Canadian RPM chart.

Track listing

Personnel
Randy Bachman - lead guitar, lead (2, 6, 8) and backing vocals
Tim Bachman - second lead guitar, backing and lead (1,7) vocals
Fred Turner - bass, lead (3, 4, 5) and backing vocals
Robbie Bachman - drums, percussion

Guest musician  
Norman Durkee - piano (8)

Production 
Producer: Randy Bachman
Engineer: Buzz Richmond
Assistant engineer: Mark Sterling
Mastering: Tom "Curly" Ruff
Equipment: John Austin
Design: John Youssi
Art direction: Jim Ladwig
Photography: Dave Roels

Charts

Certifications

Notes 

1973 albums
Bachman–Turner Overdrive albums
Mercury Records albums